Sir William Wyndham, 1st Baronet (ca. 1632 – 29 October 1683) of Orchard Wyndham, Somerset, was Member of Parliament for Somerset in 1656 and twice for Taunton in 1659 and 1660. He was Sheriff of Somerset in 1679–80.

Origins
William Wyndham was the eldest son of John Wyndham (d. 1649) and grandson of Sir John Wyndham of Orchard Wyndham (a descendant of Lady Margaret Howard, a younger daughter of the 1st Duke of Norfolk), by his wife Catherine Hopton, daughter of Robert Hopton of Witham, Somerset.

Career
He succeeded his father in 1649 when a student of Lincoln's Inn and travelled abroad from 1650 to 1653. In 1656 Wyndham was elected Member of Parliament for Somerset in the Second Protectorate Parliament. He was elected MP for Taunton 1659 in the Third Protectorate Parliament. In 1660 he was elected MP for Taunton again in the Convention Parliament. He was knighted by 24 August 1660. In 1661 he was re-elected MP for Taunton for the Cavalier Parliament. He was created by King Charles II a baronet, "of Orchard, Somerset", on 9 December 1661, and served as Sheriff of Somerset in 1679–80.

Marriage and children
Wyndham married Frances Hungerford, daughter of Anthony Hungerford of Farleigh Castle, Somerset on 8 June 1653 and had five sons and six daughters including:
Sir Edward Wyndham, 2nd Baronet (c.1667-1695), of Orchard Wyndham, eldest son and heir.
Joan Wyndham (1669–1687), first wife of William Cary (c.1661-1710) of Clovelly, Devon.

References

List of speakers: Parliaments of 1656 and 1658-9, Diary of Thomas Burton esq (1828) at British History Online

People from Taunton
Baronets in the Baronetage of England
1630s births
1683 deaths
William
High Sheriffs of Somerset
English MPs 1659
English MPs 1660
English MPs 1661–1679